Ralph Kirby may refer to:

 Conyers Kirby (1884–1946), also known as Ralph Kirby, English footballer
 Ralph Kirby (American football), American football coach